Moritz von Stuelpnagel is an American theatre director. Newsday has described him as, "best known for having staged blasphemous hand puppets" in Hand to God, for which he was nominated for a Tony Award for Best Direction of a Play in 2015.

Life and career
Von Stuelpnagel's parents emigrated from Germany to the United States in 1975. He attended Boston University College of Fine Arts School of Theatre before receiving a Masters in Fine Arts from Rutgers Mason Gross School of the Arts, Theatre Division.

From 2009 to 2015, he served as the Artistic Director of Studio 42, an Off-Off-Broadway theater company whose mission was to produce plays they deemed "unproducible".

Critic Terry Teachout of The Wall Street Journal wrote of Von Stuelpnagel's work, "[His] 2015 Broadway staging of Hand to God proved him to be a master of stage comedy, physical and otherwise." Hand to God garnered five Tony Award nominations in 2015, including Best Direction of a Play. Von Stuelpnagel directed the 2016 production of Hand to God in London's West End at the Vaudeville Theatre where it was nominated for a Laurence Olivier Award for Best New Comedy.

In 2017, he directed a Broadway revival of Noël Coward's Present Laughter starring Kevin Kline, which was nominated for a Tony Award for Best Revival of a Play. 

In 2018, von Stuelpnagel directed the premiere on Broadway of Theresa Rebeck's Bernhardt/Hamlet starring Janet McTeer.

Notable Works

References

External links
 
 
 
 Credits at About the Artists
 Biography, Huntington Theatre Company

American theatre directors
Boston University College of Fine Arts alumni
Mason Gross School of the Arts alumni

Year of birth missing (living people)
Living people